Iva Majoli was the defending champion but lost in the second round to Barbara Schett.

Martina Hingis won in the final 6–3, 7–5 against Jana Novotná.

Seeds
A champion seed is indicated in bold text while text in italics indicates the round in which that seed was eliminated. The top four seeds received a bye to the second round.

  Martina Hingis (champion)
  Jana Novotná (final)
  Arantxa Sánchez-Vicario (quarterfinals)
  Iva Majoli (second round)
  Patty Schnyder (semifinals)
  Sabine Appelmans (first round)
  Ruxandra Dragomir (first round)
  Barbara Paulus (first round)

Draw

Final

Section 1

Section 2

External links
 ITF tournament edition details

1998 WTA Tour